Ingerid Swendsdatter of Denmark (also spelt Ingrid; 11th century – after 1093) was a Danish princess who became Queen of Norway as the spouse of King Olaf III of Norway.

Ingerid Swensdatter was the daughter of King Sweyn II of Denmark. It is not known which one of her father's wives and concubines who was the mother of Ingerid.

She was married to Olav Kyrre in 1067 in a marriage arranged as a part of the peace treaty between Denmark and Norway, and became Queen of Norway upon marriage the same year. To further strengthen the alliance Olav Kyrre's half-sister, Ingegerd Haraldsdatter, married  King Olaf I of Denmark, who was the brother of Queen Ingerid.

Ingerid Svendsdatter was Olaf Kyrre's official consort and queen. There are not much information about her personality or her acts as queen.  Queen Ingerid had no children by King Olaf. After the death of King Olav in 1093, queen dowager Ingerid, according to unconfirmed tradition, moved to Sogn and married Svein Brynjulfsson of Aurland, with whom she reportedly had a daughter, Hallkattla  She seem to have retired to private life as a widow and there is nothing to indicate that she played any political part after the death of her spouse.

Ancestry

Notes

References
 Alf Henrikson (1989): Dansk historia .
 Sven Rosborn (1997): När hände vad i Nordens historia .

	

|-

House of Estridsen
Norwegian royal consorts
11th-century births
Year of birth unknown
Year of death unknown
Danish princesses
Place of birth unknown
Place of death unknown
11th-century Norwegian people
11th-century Swedish people
11th-century Norwegian women
11th-century Swedish women
Remarried royal consorts
Daughters of kings